Carolina Algonquian (also known as Pamlico, Croatoan) was an Algonquian language of the Eastern Algonquian subgroup formerly spoken in North Carolina, United States. Carolina Algonquian was formerly spoken by Secotan (later known as Machapunga), Chowanoke and Weapemeoc (subgroups Poteskeit and Paspatank) peoples.

Translation into English

In 1584 Sir Walter Raleigh had dispatched the first of a number of expeditions to Roanoke Island to explore and eventually settle the New World. Early encounters with the natives were friendly, and, despite the difficulties in communication, the explorers were able to persuade "two of the savages, being  men, whose names were Wanchese and Manteo" to accompany them on the return voyage to London, in order for the English people to report both the conditions of the New World that they had explored and what the usefulness of the territory might be to the English.

Once safely delivered to England, the two Indians quickly made a sensation at court. Raleigh's priority, however, was not publicity but rather intelligence about his new land of Virginia, and he restricted access to the exotic newcomers, assigning the brilliant scientist Thomas Harriot the job of deciphering and learning the Carolina Algonquian language, using a phonetic alphabet of his own invention in order to effect the translation.

Related languages

Carolina Algonquian forms a part of the same language group as Powhatan or Virginia Algonquian, a  similarly extinct language of the Eastern Algonquian subgroup of the Algonquian language family, itself a member of the Algic language family. Powhatan was spoken by the Powhatan people of tidewater Virginia until the late 18th century, dying out in the 1790s after speakers switched to English.

What little is known of Powhatan is by way of wordlists recorded by William Strachey (about 500 words)  and Captain John Smith (about 50 words). Smith also reported a pidgin form of Powhatan, but almost nothing is known of it.

Smith's material was collected between 1607 and 1609, and published in 1612 and again in 1624. There is no indication of the location where he collected his material. Strachey's material was collected sometime between 1610 and 1611, and probably written up from his notes in 1612 and 1613, after he had returned to England. It was never published, and remained in manuscript form, although Strachey made a second copy in 1618. The second copy was published in 1849, and the first in 1955.

Legacy
The Carolina Algonquian language is now extinct, and the communities in which it flourished are gone. However, a number of Algonquian loan words have survived by being absorbed into the English language. Among them are: moccasin, moose, opossum, papoose, pecan, raccoon, skunk, squash, squaw, and wigwam.

See also
Aquascogoc
Dasamongueponke
Powhatan language
Pamlico
Secotan

Notes

References

 Feest, Christian. 1978. "Virginia Algonquin." Bruce Trigger, ed., Handbook of North American Indians. Volume 15. Northeast, pp. 253–271. Washington: Smithsonian Institution.
 Lovgren, Stefan. 2006. "'New World' Film Revives Extinct Native American Tongue", National Geographic News, January 20, 2006.
 Marianne Mithun. 1999. The Languages of Native North America. Cambridge Language Family Surveys.  Cambridge:  Cambridge University Press.
 Frank Siebert.  1975.  "Resurrecting Virginia Algonquian from the dead:  The reconstituted and historical phonology of Powhatan," Studies in Southeastern Indian Languages.  Ed. James Crawford.  Athens:  University of Georgia Press. Pages 285-453.
Kupperman, Karen Ordahl.  Indians and English: Facing Off in Early America.  Ithaca: Cornell University Press, 2000.
Mancall, Peter C.  Hakluyt's Promise: An Elizabethan's Obsession for an English America.  New Haven: Yale University Press, 2007.
Milton, Giles, Big Chief Elizabeth – How England's Adventurers Gambled and Won the New World, Hodder & Stoughton, London (2000)
Vaughan, Alden T. "Sir Walter Raleigh's Indian Interpreters, 1584-1618."  The William and Mary Quarterly  59.2 (2002): 341-376.

External links
Algonquian Derivations at Wiktionary.org Retrieved December 2012
OLAC resources in and about the Carolina Algonquian language
OLAC resources in and about the Lumbee language
OLAC resources in and about the Pamlico language

Eastern Algonquian languages
Indigenous languages of the North American Southeast
Extinct languages of North America
Languages of North Carolina
Native American history of North Carolina
Native American history of South Carolina
Native American history of Virginia
Languages extinct in the 18th century
1790s disestablishments in the United States